= Ulaan mine =

- Location: Mongolia
- Products: Lead, Zinc

The Ulaan mine is one of the largest lead and zinc mines in Mongolia. The mine is located in southern Mongolia. The mine has reserves amounting to 38.8 million tonnes of ore grading 1.09% lead and 1.9% zinc thus resulting 0.42 million tonnes of lead and 0.74 million tonnes of zinc. The mine also has reserves amounting to 256,000 oz.
